Alvito Ronaldo Correia D'Cunha (born 12 July 1978, in Sanvordem) is a retired Indian football player. He was a former member of the India national team and represented India in the 2002 FIFA World Cup qualifiers. He spent most of his club career in East Bengal.

Playing career
He played for East Bengal as a left winger for a long span of 14 seasons. He retired at the start of 2016 season as the club had not included D'Cunha in the squad. He previously played for two renowned Goan sides Salgaocar SC (1998–2002), and Sesa SC (1997–1998).

He made a start after a few years for East Bengal against Kalighat Milan Sangha F.C. in the inaugural match of the  Calcutta Premier Division 2013, where he scored from a penalty on the 15th minute, and assisted his state-mate Joaquim Abranches with a forward through pass to score his first goal for the Kolkata-based side.

Statistics

International

Honours

Salgaocar
National Football League (1): 1998–99
Super Cup (1): 1999
Rovers Cup (1): 1999
Durand Cup (1): 1999
Governor's Cup (2): 1999, 2001

East Bengal
ASEAN Club Championship (1): 2003
National Football League (2): 2002–03, 2003–04
Federation Cup (4): 2007, 2009–10, 2010, 2012
Super Cup (2): 2006, 2011
IFA Shield (2): 2002, 2012
Durand Cup (2): 2002, 2004
Calcutta Premier Division (8): 2002, 2003, 2004, 2006, 2010,  2011, 2012, 2013.

India
SAFF Championship: 2005; third place: 2003

References

External links
 
 

1978 births
Living people
Indian footballers
Indian Roman Catholics
India international footballers
Footballers from Goa
I-League players
Salgaocar FC players
East Bengal Club players
Association football wingers
People from South Goa district